Bilenke is a village in Dovzhansk Raion, Luhansk Oblast (province) of Ukraine.

Demographics
Native language as of the Ukrainian Census of 2001:
 Ukrainian 4.82%
 Russian 95.18%

References

Villages in Dovzhansk Raion